Lars Christian Lilleholt (born 2 March 1965 in Odense) is a Danish politician, who is a member of the Folketing for the Venstre political party. He was Minister of Energy, Utilities and Climate from 2015 to 2019. He was elected into parliament in the 2001 Danish general election.

Political career
His political career started as member of Venstres Ungdom's National Committee 1983–88, from 1985 to 1988 serving as deputy chairman. He was a member of the board of Venstre 1985–89. He has been a parliamentary candidate for Venstre since 1993 He served as temporary Member of Parliament 14 January – 31 January 1997 and 18 January – 10 February 2000. 

Lilleholt is a journalist by profession. Former places of employment include Vejle Amts Folkeblad 1990-91 and 1993–94, Fyns Amts Avis 1994–95, and the Danish District Heating Association (Danske Fjernvarmeværkers Forening) since 1995.

References

External links
Official website
 

1965 births
Living people
People from Odense
Venstre (Denmark) politicians
Government ministers of Denmark
Members of the Folketing 2001–2005
Members of the Folketing 2005–2007
Members of the Folketing 2007–2011
Members of the Folketing 2011–2015
Members of the Folketing 2015–2019
Members of the Folketing 2019–2022
Members of the Folketing 2022–2026